The Camp House is a historic house at 4684 West Arkansas Highway 60 in Aplin, Arkansas.  It is a -story wood-frame house, with a gabled roof, weatherboard siding, and a stone foundation.  Its roof has deep eaves with applied decorative elements, and exposed rafter ends in the eaves.  The front  is adorned by a gable dormer, polygonal bay, and porch, all with bracketed gable roofs.  The house was built about 1917 for James Camp, and is one of the small community's most distinctive examples of Craftsman architecture.  It is also likely that the house was built from a kit Mr. Camp purchased from Sears, Roebuck.

The house was listed on the National Register of Historic Places in 2013.

See also
National Register of Historic Places listings in Perry County, Arkansas

References

Houses on the National Register of Historic Places in Arkansas
Colonial Revival architecture in Arkansas
Houses completed in 1917
1917 establishments in Arkansas
American Craftsman architecture in Arkansas
Sears Modern Homes